Inkle is a video game development company based in Cambridge, United Kingdom that specialises in interactive narrative, i.e. text-focused computer video games. They are notable for games such as 80 Days, which was Time Magazine's Game of the Year in 2014, and Sorcery!, a recreation of Steve Jackson’s Sorcery! gamebook series.

Inkle has also created inklewriter, a tool for creating interactive fiction that was online from 2012 until 2018. inklewriter was subsequently revived as free and open-source software in 2019.

History 
Inkle was founded in November 2011 by Jon Ingold and Joseph Humfrey. Their first project was an interactive, choice-based version of Mary Shelley's novel Frankenstein, written by gamebook author Dave Morris and published by Profile Books. It received mixed reactions, earning a Kirkus Reviews “Best of 2012” star, while The Guardian described it as “digital butchery”, noting its “bewildering” format and how, despite being billed as “interactive”, users cannot change how the base story plays out.

In May 2013 they released the first game in a fantasy series, Sorcery!, based on gamebooks by famous UK games designer Steve Jackson. The adaptation was widely praised, with IGN calling it “a prime example of what can happen when traditional storytelling gets along with contemporary game design”. The first sequel followed in November 2013 and was substantially larger in scope, with the final two installments published in April 2015 and September 2016.

They have collaborated with Penguin Books on two apps. “Poems by Heart” is a memorisation game intended to help readers learn poetry and was chosen as one of Kirkus Reviews' Best Books of 2013. In the same year they worked with author Kelley Armstrong on The Cainsville Files, a visual-novel style interactive prequel to her Cainsville book series.

Gamasutra named them one of their top 10 developers of 2014, saying their game 80 Days “set an exciting bar for what mainstream interactive fiction could look like... without sacrificing sophistication and depth for accessibility”. The New York Times cited it an example of successful interactive storytelling while The Telegraph called it “one of the best branching narratives ever created” and “one of the best books of 2014”.

Pendragon, a “narrative roguelike” game based on Arthurian legend, was released in fall '20, and PC Gamer considered the game to be “an accessible strategy game tied to a powerful, dynamic story generator”, giving it a 78% score.

Authoring tools 
In 2012, Inkle created inklewriter, an online tool for creating interactive fiction. It was used in schools and was awarded a “Best Website for Teaching and Learning” award by American Association of School Librarians in 2013. It was also used by some game developers, such as Stoic Studios to aid in development of their game The Banner Saga.
In August 2018, Inkle closed inklewriter citing lack of time to solve its issues, but was later as free-to-use open-source software.
Instead, Inkle promotes ink, a markup language for interactive fiction and a specialised editor inky.
The language is available under the open-source MIT license and can be integrated in game engines.

Games

References

External links 

British companies established in 2011
Companies based in Cambridge
Privately held companies of England
Video game companies established in 2011
Video game companies of the United Kingdom
2011 establishments in England
Video game development companies